Fenimorea fucata is a species of sea snail, a marine gastropod mollusc in the family Drilliidae.

Description
The size of an adult shell varies between 10 mm and 27 mm. The shell is obsoletely channeled above the periphery which is not prominently angulated. The longitudinal ribs are numerous, rounded, not prominent, not interrupted on the periphery but continuous to the suture. The shell is sometimes obsoletely spirally striated.  The back of the body whorl has a peculiar hump or longitudinal varix. The shell is yellowish white, banded and maculated with yellowish or orange-brown.

Distribution
This species occurs in the benthic zone of the Caribbean Sea, the Gulf of Mexico, the Lesser Antilles and Puerto Rico; in the Atlantic Ocean from the Bahamas to Brazil at depths between 6 mm and 45 m.

This species was also found as a fossil in the strata of the Caloosahatchee Formation, Quaternary of Florida at North St Petersburg

References

 Rosenberg, G., F. Moretzsohn, and E. F. García. 2009. Gastropoda (Mollusca) of the Gulf of Mexico, Pp. 579–699 in Felder, D.L. and D.K. Camp (eds.), Gulf of Mexico–Origins, Waters, and Biota. Biodiversity. Texas A&M Press, College Station, Texas
  Tucker, J.K. 2004 Catalog of recent and fossil turrids (Mollusca: Gastropoda). Zootaxa 682:1–1295
 Coomans, H. E. "Studies on the Fauna of Curaçao and other Caribbean Islands: nr. 72

External links
 
 De Jong K.M. & Coomans H.E. (1988) Marine gastropods from Curaçao, Aruba and Bonaire. Leiden: E.J. Brill. 261 pp. 

fucata
Gastropods described in 1845